Cascade Plaza is an open space with plantings and pedestrian walkways in Akron, Ohio. It was developed in the late 1960s as part of an urban renewal project that also included construction of two high rises. As of 2013 plans were going forward for a major overhaul.

Location
The plaza was built on the site of a five-story flour mill built by Dr. Eliakim Crosby in 1831. A diversion dam was built on the Little Cuyahoga River in Middlebury, from which a canal brought water south down the present Main Street, turning right at Mill Street to deliver power to the mill at Lock Five, where the plaza's hotel is now. The canal also powered other factories. The hamlet of Cascade grew up in the area, with a population of 128 by July 1833, compared to 329 for Akron.
The Flatiron Building, a seven-story low rise built in 1907 and demolished in 1967 also stood on the site.

Plaza
The plaza lies on the west side of South Main Street, and forms the roof of a five-level underground parking lot.
Lawrence Halprin planned the Cascade Plaza. It was a major urban renewal project covering  and featuring a central skating rink.
The plaza has a fountain sculpture  designed by Don Drumm and erected in 1968, overleaf, stainless steel rods with anodized, cast aluminum panels.

Buildings
There are four buildings on the site, linked at the ground level by the plaza: Akron City Center Hotel, Cascade I, Cascade III and Huntington Tower.
The hotel (formerly the Radisson Hotel Akron City Centre) is a 19-story modernist high rise complete in 1969.
Cascade I, at One Cascade Plaza and 140 South Main Street, is also called the PNC Center. 
It is a 23-story steel high-rise completed in 1969.
Three Cascade Plaza is a seven-story concrete low-rise, also completed in 1969.
Huntington Tower, at 106 South Main Street, is a 27-story steel tower with an art deco brick facade completed in 1931.

Plans
In October 2013 the Akron City Council voted to approve a complete overhaul of the plaza, partly funded by the city and partly by FirstMerit Corporation, a bank. The plan was to demolish the concrete plaza, then reseal the deck and convert it to green space, open to the street. The new space would have plants, benches and tables.

References
Citations

Sources

 

Squares in the United States
Geography of Akron, Ohio
Squares in Ohio